The Horsehope or Horse Hope Craig Hoard is a Bronze Age hoard found in Scotland in 1864. 

The hoard was discovered by a shepherd, under a stone in scree on Horse Hope Craig, a hill rising to the east of Manor Water, south of Peebles. The local farmer, Mr Linton of Glenrath, investigated the nearby area but found no more objects. The objects are thought to be fittings from a cart and horse harness, and to date from the 7th and 6th centuries BC.  Fifteen bronze rings, a bronze rapier and other bronze objects were given to Peebles Museum, now the Tweeddale Museum and Gallery, and a socketed axe was placed in the then National Museum of Antiquities of Scotland, described as "Socketed axe, smooth, green, trimmed, blade hammered, haft ribs. Length 82mm, mouth 25 x 28mm, cutting edge 50mm, weight 215 gms".

When a Bronze Age hoard (working name: Peebles Hoard) was discovered in June 2020 near Peebles, The Scotsman stated that "Only one type of similar hoard is known from Scotland, which was found at Horsehope Craig, Peeblesshire."

See also
Peebles hoard
List of Bronze Age hoards in Great Britain

References

Bronze Age Scotland
Peeblesshire
Hoards of jewellery
Bronze Age sites in Scotland
Axes